In Acre, Brazil, the Firefighters Corps is part of the structure of the government.

History 
Since the establishment of the Provisional Government of the Independent State of Acre, in 1899, a Fire Brigade was attached to the Department of Justice. Subsequently, with the transformation of the region into Federal Territory, this service started to be done on a precarious basis by the companies Regional Police. The current Fire Department was only effectively organized in 1974, attached to the creation of the Military Police of Acre State. On 18 December 1990 the Corporation separated from the Military Police, starting to enjoy autonomy administrative and financial, and reporting directly to the State Government.

Organization 
The Military Firefighters of Acre State is formed by battalions, companies, and platoons.
The battalions and independent companies are organized into Regional Commands. These Commands are in major urban centers, and their battalions and companies are distributed according to population density in cities.

Mission
The mission of the Firefighters Corps is the implementation of activities of civil defense, prevention and firefighting, search and rescue, and public assistance under the State of Acre. The unit is reserve troop and ancillary force of the Brazilian Army, and integrating the system public security and social protection in Brazil.
 Fire prevention and extinction urban and forest is;
 Conducting search and rescue services for people, animals, goods and possessions;
 Pre-hospital emergency care;
 Conducting surveys in Buildings;
 Conducting fire assessments;
 Relief assistance in cases of Floods, landslides or catastrophes; where there is people in imminent danger of life, or threat of destruction of assets;
 Study, analysis, planning and inspection of fire safety, at the state level;
 Embargo or interdiction of public works, services, houses or places of entertainment, which do not offer conditions of security for the operation;
 Study, Prevention and fight against forest fires;
 In case of mobilization of the Brazilian Army, cooperation in Civil Defense services upon authorization from the State Government.

Emergency telephone number 
In all of Brazil, the emergency telephone number of the Military Firefighters Corps is one, nine, three (193). It is a toll-free call.

Uniforms 
The Firefighters Corps of Acre wear the same uniforms of the Military Firefighters of Acre State, just adding their badges and insignias.

Rank insignia

Officers

NCO and enlisted grades

See also 
 List of fire departments
 Military Firefighters Corps
 Military police in Brazil
 Brazilian Armed Forces
 Military Police (Brazil)

References

Sources 
 Bombeiros do Paraná; Herbert Munhoz van Erven; Edição do author; Curitiba – 1954.

M
Military fire departments
Fire departments
Acre
Acre (state)